Godolphin Cross is a village in the former Kerrier District of west Cornwall, England. It is in the civil parish of Breage, midway between the towns of Hayle and Helston.

Godolphin Cross is in an upland area, part of a geological formation known as the Tregonning-Godolphin Granite. The term refers to the plateau of high ground in this area, one of five granite batholiths in Cornwall (see Geology of Cornwall).

The Godolphin Estate is near the village. It is now completely owned by the National Trust, and is undergoing extensive renovation. The whole estate and surrounding woodlands are once again open to the public, who were excluded from most of the estate by the former owners. Godolphin Primary School serves children from 4 to 11 years and had a roll of 82 children in November 2021. It received a good Ofsted report in June 2015.

The Church of St John the Baptist is now redundant. It was designed by James Piers St Aubyn and built in 1849–50. In 2006, an application was received by Kerrier District Council to convert the church into a private dwelling.

There is a Cornish cross in the churchyard. In 1886 it was moved to the churchyard, having been found in use as a gatepost on the Chytodden estate.

In June 2017 the village hall was saved by a gift from His Highness Sheikh Mohammed bin Rashid Al Maktoum, the Emir of Dubai, after villagers pointed out to him the historic link between their village and Francis Godolphin, 2nd Earl of Godolphin, who bred from the legendary Godolphin Arabian, one of three stallions from which all thoroughbreds are descended. The Sheikh is head of the global Godolphin horse racing empire. The building was formerly the Methodist Chapel and school room. The chapel organ came from another Methodist chapel in 1936. Built by H P Dicker of Exeter in the 1890s, it has been preserved. It was taken down and moved to storage at The Cornish Heritage Collection at Poldark Mine Museum six miles away.  It is due to be erected later in 2018 so that it can be played along with several other Methodist Chapel organs already at the museum.

References

Villages in Cornwall